The A 10 road is an A-Grade trunk road in Sri Lanka. It connects Katugastota with Puttalam.

The A 10 passes through Galagedara, Mawathagama, Kurunegala, Wariyapola, Padeniya, Nikavaratiya, Anamaduwa, and Kalladi to reach Puttalam.

References

Highways in Sri Lanka